Breamore Priory was a priory of Austin canons in Breamore, Hampshire, England.

Foundation
The priory was founded some time towards the end of the reign of Henry I by Baldwin de Redvers and his uncle Hugh de Redvers.

12th to 16th centuries
In the 14th century, the Courtenay Compendium was created at Breamore.

Dissolution
The last prior, Prior Finch, wrote at least twice to Thomas Cromwell proffering his service and that of his house, and desiring Cromwell's favour. But according to the Valor Ecclesiasticus of 1535 the annual value of the priory was £200 5s. 1½d., together with two pounds of pepper. Less alms and other obligatory outgoings of £45 11s. the annual value was only £154 14s. 1½d. and the pepper. This brought the house well below the limit for the first series of dissolutions, and it was surrendered on 10 July 1536.

Post-Dissolution
The site of the priory and all its possessions was granted in November 1536 to Henry, Marquis of Exeter, and his wife Gertrude. Several of the manors of Breamore and Southwick Priory were included in the dower lands of Anne of Cleves in January 1540.

A large manor house, Breamore House, was built on the site in 1583.

Present day
No above ground remains of the priory survive, although cropmarks can be seen on satellite imagery of the site.

Burials
Isabella de Forz, Countess of Devon (1237–1293)

See also
List of monastic houses in Hampshire
List of monastic houses in England

References

Sources
A History of the County of Hampshire: Volume 2, The Victoria County History 1973

Augustinian monasteries in England
Priories in Hampshire
12th-century establishments in England
1536 disestablishments in England
Christian monasteries established in the 12th century